The 1937–38 season was the 29th in the history of the Isthmian League, an English football competition.

Leytonstone were champions, winning their second Isthmian League title.

League table

References

Isthmian League seasons
I